A surcharge may refer to:

An extra fee added onto another fee or charge
 Bunker adjustment factor, sea freight charges which represents additions due to oil prices
 Surcharge (payment systems), charged by merchants when receiving payment by cheque, credit, charge or debit card
An overprint that affects the value of a postage stamp
A surcharge (sanction) against a public servant who has abused public funds
Surtax, extra tax levied upon tax
 Surcharge (soil load), vertical loads applied to the ground surface on the uphill side of a retaining wall
 Surcharge, or hydraulic head